The langsuyar, also lang suir or langsuir, is a female revenant in Malay and other mythologies in the Malay archipelago. The word is derived from the Malay word for eagle (helang).

Description 
A langsuyar is a type of vampire which is the ghost of a woman who died while pregnant or giving birth. Langsuyars are different from the pontianak, which is the ghost of the child who has died at or before birth. They take the form of a beautiful woman, with long black hair that reaches her ankles, although they may also take the form of a floating woman's head, from which entrails and a spinal column hang -- thus, similar in appearance to the penanggalan, although different in nature. Langsuyars have also been described as having incredibly long nails, hands extending down to her feet, and wearing green robes. They prey on humans, preferring the blood of newborn male children, but also consuming newborn female children.

Origin 
In his book Malay Magic, Walter William Skeat, an English anthropologist, recorded the origins of the langsuyar myth, as told by Malays in Selangor:

Traditions 

The langsuyar is associated with certain trees and the parasitic fern "sakat," which grows in dark green clusters and is said to be a common resting place. Woodcutters that harvest wood from the poisonous Rengas trees in Malaysia must undertake elaborate exorcisms to counteract being haunted by langsuyars and other spirits. Langsuyars are also associated with a nighthawk or owl, which is said to perch on the roof of the house while a pregnant mother or infant are being attacked by the vampire. In some traditions, langsuyars take the form of a night bird, and it is believed that the hoot of an owl is the cry of a woman seeking her lost child.

The rest of the tribe can prevent a deceased woman from returning as a langsuyar by putting glass beads in the mouth of the corpse, a hen's egg under the armpits, and needles in the palms of the hands. It is believed that if this is done, the deceased woman cannot become a langsuyar since she cannot open her mouth to shriek or wave her arms and open and close her hands while flying.

In the folklore of the Sakai, an indigenous people in the northern Malay Peninsula, a langsuyar can be repelled by using charms or chants against the demon. The leaves of the gandasuli are also considered to be a powerful charm against langsuyars.

Modern encounters 
In 2013, villagers in the Pasir Puteh district in Kelantan, Malaysia, reported sightings of a langsuyar that was terrorizing the town. The residents described seeing a long-haired banshee flying and cackling in the night, and claims of sightings spread to nearby villages. Local authorities urged the villages to remain calm and pray together to repel the spirit. Rumors of the demonic appearances ended after a local shaman claimed to have captured four of the creatures. A local religious officer acknowledged the existence of the spirit, but cautioned against talk of magic as it may be sacrilegious.

See also
 Hun and po
 Keres (Κῆρες), spirits of violent or cruel death in Greek mythology
 Madam Koi Koi
 Malay folklore
 Penanggalan
 Sundel Bolong
 Tai Thong Klom
 White Lady (ghost)

Notes

References 

Indonesian legendary creatures
Malay ghost myth
Malay folklore
Corporeal undead
Indonesian folklore
Female legendary creatures
Revenants
Banshees